Ernst Kreuder (29 August 1903 – 24 December 1972) was a German writer. He was born in Zeitz and died in Darmstadt.

Work 
His 1946 work The Attic Pretenders concerned a secret associations view of imagination and reality and was well received. Unica Zürn considered it to be one of her favorite books. He also wrote works like Those Who Cannot Be Found and The Undiscoverables. Although his works have been described as melancholy or Kafkaesque
he stated that "the literary fashion of hopeless despair must be overcome."

Awards 
1953 Georg Büchner Prize

References 

1903 births
1972 deaths
Georg Büchner Prize winners
German male writers